Michel Yatim (4 December 1920 - 16 September 2006) was Archbishop of the Melkite Greek Catholic Archeparchy of Latakia in Syria.

Life

Michel Yatim was born on December 4, 1920 in Aleppo.

On July 20, 1946 Michel Yatim became an ordained priest. His appointment as Archbishop of Latakia and successor of Archbishop Paul Achkar was received on 18 August 1981. The Patriarch of Antioch Maximos V Hakim was his consecrator and his co-consecrators were Archbishop Néophytos Edelby of Aleppo and Auxiliary Bishop of Antioch François Abou Mokh on 23 October 1981.

On July 18, 1995 Michel Yakim retired of his duties as Archeparch and took over until his death on September 16, 2006, the Office of the Archbishop Emeritues of Latakia. He was the consecrator of the eparch Fares Maakaroun.

See also
Catholic Church in Syria

References

External links
 http://www.catholic-hierarchy.org/bishop/byatim.html 

1920 births
2006 deaths
Syrian archbishops
Melkite Greek Catholic bishops
Eastern Catholic bishops in Syria